XHAW-FM is a radio station on 101.3 FM in Monterrey, Nuevo León. The station is owned by Multimedios Radio and carries a romantic format known as La Gran AW; since 2012, it has been simulcast on XEAW-AM 1280. The station also transmits the Telediario newscasts from co-owned Multimedios Televisión.

History
On October 20, 1983, a concession was issued to Francisco Ibarra López, the president of Grupo ACIR, for a new radio station on 101.3 MHz in Monterrey, named XHIL-FM using his initials.

Effective July 16, 1993, ACIR sold XHIL-FM to Multimedios, in the person of Francisco Antonio González Sánchez. The station was simultaneously renamed XHAW-FM. (Grupo ACIR now owns another XHIL-FM, in the state of Veracruz.)

References

Radio stations in Monterrey
Radio stations established in 1983
Multimedios Radio